Jon Volpe is a former running back in the Canadian Football League.

Early life
Volpe had a difficult childhood. His father left when he was 5 years old, his mother was an alcoholic and lived on the street, and his brother went to jail several times. Jon Volpe, being only 5 feet 7 inches tall, received a football scholarship to  Stanford University, where he was an all-conference running back (leading in rushing yards), earning GTE Academic All-American honors and being named a Rhodes Scholar nominee (while getting a BSc in engineering.)

Professional career
He was not drafted by the NFL. However, he had a tryout with the Pittsburgh Steelers before he headed to Canada to play for the B.C. Lions. He had a successful rookie season in 1991; rushing behind Doug Flutie (who threw for a record 6,619 yards), Volpe added 1,395 rushing yards and led the league with 16 rushing touchdowns and 20 total touchdowns. Volpe was named an All-Star and won the CFL's Most Outstanding Rookie Award. In 1992, he added 941 yards and 13 touchdowns, and was again named an All-Star. A contract dispute meant a late start to the 1993 season and he had a generally unsuccessful season, appearing in only five games. He left the Lions after three years and 36 games.

Volpe moved to the expansion Las Vegas Posse in 1994, rushing 43 times for 182 yards and 3 touchdowns in four games. He signed with the Pittsburgh Steelers in 1995, but a preseason shoulder injury ended his career.

Private life
Volpe is chairman and CEO of Nova Home Loans. He is married to Heather and has a daughter, Kaylie, and a son, Trevor.

Footnotes

References 
Jon Volpe in the Tucson Weekly, Feb. 5, 2004
B.C. Lions Media Guide

BC Lions players
Las Vegas Posse players
Stanford Cardinal football players
1968 births
Living people
Canadian Football League Rookie of the Year Award winners
People from Chippewa County, Michigan
Players of American football from Michigan
American football running backs   
Canadian football running backs
American players of Canadian football